Presidential elections were held in the Republic of New Granada in 1857. Following constitutional reforms in 1853, they were the first direct presidential elections in the country. The result was a victory for Mariano Ospina Rodríguez of the Conservative Party.

Results

References

Colombia
1857 in the Republic of New Granada
Presidential elections in Colombia